The 2017–18 Marquette Golden Eagles women's basketball team represented Marquette University in the 2017–18 NCAA Division I women's basketball season. The Golden Eagles, led by fourth year head coach Carolyn Kieger, play their home games at the Al McGuire Center and were members of the Big East Conference. They finished the season 24–10, 16–2 in Big East in Big East play to share the Big East regular season title with DePaul. They advanced to the championship game of the Big East women's tournament where they lost to DePaul. They received an at-large bid to the NCAA women's tournament where they defeated Dayton in the first round before losing to Louisville in the second round.

Previous season
They finished the season 25–8, 13–5 in Big East play to finish in third place. They won the Big East tournament title for the first time in school history and earn an automatic trip to the NCAA women's tournament where they got upset by Quinnipiac in the first round.

Roster

Schedule

|-
!colspan=9 style=|Exhibition

|-
!colspan=9 style=| Non-conference regular season

|-
!colspan=9 style=| Big East regular season

|-
!colspan=9 style=| Big East  Women's Tournament

|-
!colspan=9 style=| NCAA Women's Tournament

Rankings
2017–18 NCAA Division I women's basketball rankings

See also
2017–18 Marquette Golden Eagles men's basketball team

References

Marquette
Marquette Golden Eagles women's basketball seasons
Marquette
Marquette
Marquette